Charles Baird may refer to:

Charles Baird (engineer) (1766–1843), Scottish engineer
Charles A. Baird (1870–1944), University of Michigan athletic director, 1898–1909
Charles F. Baird (1922–2009), United States Under Secretary of the Navy and CEO of Inco Ltd.
Charles Washington Baird (1828–1887), American Presbyterian minister and historian

See also
Charles Baird Curtis, vice-president of the United States